The Galway Film Fleadh (Irish for "festival") is an international film festival founded in 1989 as part of the Galway Arts Festival. Describing itself as Ireland’s leading film festival, the event is held every July in Galway city in Ireland.

In 2022, a MovieMaker magazine panel of U.S. filmmakers, critics and industry executives included the Galway Film Fleadh on its list of the "50 Film Festivals Worth the Entry Fee".

Galway Film Fleadh welcome a diversity of filmmaking from all around the world, crossing all generations and cultural backgrounds. They bring luminaries of the craft and everyday cinephiles together to share in the wonder of cinema.

Background
The festival was founded in 1989, as part of the Galway Arts Festival and was held at the Claddagh Palace until that venue closed in 1995.  The festival has become known as a venue for the premiere of domestic Irish films, but as an international festival, it also exhibits foreign film works.

Since its inception, the Galway Film Fleadh and the Irish film industry have grown in tandem with one another. In 1997, the Fleadh hosted the inaugural edition of the Galway Film Fair, the UK and Ireland’s first dedicated film market. The festival includes the Galway Film Fair, a focused film market which allows filmmakers with projects in development to meet with a large number of potential producers, financiers, and distributors.

Running alongside the festival each year, the Galway Film Fair has also expanded to include a range of industry-led events including our annual Pitching Competition, masterclasses, case studies, and their annual industry-wide conference, the Fleadh Forum.

In 2006 the Galway Film Fleadh was the site of the first screening of John Carney's film Once.

Since 1995 the Fleadh has also conducted the Junior Film Fleadh, held in November and oriented to youth films and student audiences.

As a festival of discovery, the Galway Film Fleadh takes care to nurture the next generation of filmmaking talent through our young audiences festival, the Junior Film Fleadh. Each winter, the Junior Film Fleadh runs screenings & events for young audiences and filmmakers, as well as acting as Irish host to the European Film Academy’s Young Audience Award each spring.

References

External links
 

Film festivals in Ireland
Culture in Galway (city)
1989 establishments in Ireland
Film festivals established in 1989